Aji Yam Secka ( Ajaratou Mariama (Yamu) Secka ; also known as Mariama B. Secka) is a Gambian politician who was deputy leader of the United Democratic Party (UDP) and a long time women leader acting in various capacity. From 1998 to 2001, she was Secretary General of the party's women. She was deputy director of UND from 2011 to 2018. Secka became the head of the party in 2016 when the leader of the party, Ousainou Darboe, was held in detention by the government. Secka was one of the opposition leaders who formed a political alliance that endorsed the candidacy of Adama Barrow who eventually defeated the incumbent President Yahaya Jammeh.

References 

United Democratic Party (Gambia) politicians
21st-century Gambian women politicians
21st-century Gambian politicians
Living people
Year of birth missing (living people)